The National Council of Women of Thailand (NCWT), is a women's organization in Thailand, founded in 1957.

It was founded to function as an umbrella organization for the women's associations of Thailand. It was the first and the largest umbrella organization of women's rights in Thailand.

References

Organizations established in 1957
1957 establishments in Thailand
Women's rights organizations
Women's organizations based in Thailand
Feminism in Thailand
History of women in Thailand